Oecleini is a planthopper tribe in the subfamily Cixiinae.

Genera

References

External links 
 

 
Cixiinae
Hemiptera tribes